Dom Airton José dos Santos (born in Bom Repouso, June 26, 1956) is a Brazilian priest and bishop, was bishop of the diocese of Mogi das Cruzes from 2002 until 2012. He was appointed Archbishop of Campinas by Pope Benedict XVI on February 15, 2012.

References

External links
 Diocese of Mogi das Cruzes 
  Archidiocese de Campinas 

21st-century Roman Catholic archbishops in Brazil
Living people
1956 births
Pontifical Gregorian University alumni
Roman Catholic archbishops of Campinas
Roman Catholic archbishops of Mariana
Roman Catholic bishops of Mogi das Cruzes
Roman Catholic bishops of Santo André